Naples is a neighborhood of Long Beach, California, United States, built on three islands located in Alamitos Bay. The islands are divided by canals which open into the bay. Most of the streets on the island have Italianate names. The center of Naples features a large fountain which serves as a popular meeting spot. The city was named after the Italian city Naples.

History

Naples was once marshland within the artificial Alamitos Bay, at the mouth of the San Gabriel River. Around 1903, Arthur M. Parsons raised $500,000 from investors and purchased the marshland from the Alamitos Land Company. Construction began in August, 1905, reshaping the existing land and water into the three islands of Naples. The design was by the firm Mayberry & Parker, who also contributed to the Hotel Wentworth in Pasadena. The concept of canals and gondolas was similar to the "Venice of America" developed by Abbot Kinney up the coast. Parson's Naples Land Company called its plans the "Dreamland of Southern California," and projected that "through the canals and under the high arching bridges gay gondoliers will propel their crafts like those in the waters of the Adriatic under the blue skies of Italy." The project was completed in the 1920s, then rebuilt after the 1933 Long Beach earthquake.

From 1904 to 1950, the neighborhood was served by the Pacific Electric Balboa Line.

Activities

Marine Park AKA "Mother's Beach"
This sheltered beach allows for various activities due to the volleyball courts, play area and picnic sites. Known as "Mother's Beach" for its gentle wave action, as well as its shallow swimming area paired with lifeguard supervision during peak periods. Marina Park offers both a great beach for kids and a nearby grassy play area.

Christmas Boat Parade
One very popular Christmas-time event in Naples is the "Naples Island Christmas Boat Parade," with groups of decorated boats going through the canals of Naples, around Alamitos Bay, and past Belmont Shore. The parade has been held since 1946.

On the Bay Fun 
At various locations near Naples Island, services for kayak rentals, stand-up paddle boarding, and hydro biking are available. Hydro bikes, are similar to paddle boats, yet are elevated in design to allow for better site-seeing. They also come in single occupancy and double occupancy.

Overlook Park 
Known locally as Naples Plaza. This small bay front park is a tear-drop shaped strip of land stretching from the west end of Corso di Napoli and terminating at the east end of Corso di Oro. It has a few park benches with a view of Seal Beach as well as Los Alamitos Bay.

La Bella Fontana di Napoli
In the middle of Naples Island, a small park is located that includes benches, bay views only a block away, and grass centered around an elegant, three-tiered circular fountain. It was originally named "Circle Park Naples" in 1933, and renamed in 1934 to "Bella Flora Park." In 1971, the park was given its current name "La Bella Fontana di Napoli". A well-liked place for a picnic that is a short distance from the Los Alamitos Bay walkways and views.

Education
Naples residents are zoned to Long Beach Unified School District schools:
 Naples Bayside Academy
 Will Rogers Middle School
 Wilson Classical High School

Architecture

See also
Neighborhoods of Long Beach, California
Long Beach Marine Stadium

References

External links
 Naples Improvement Association
 Naples Island Business Association

Neighborhoods in Long Beach, California
Tourist attractions in Long Beach, California
Populated places established in 1903
1903 establishments in California
Islands of Los Angeles County, California
Islands of Southern California